Chhotey Lal is an Indian politician.  He was elected to the Lok Sabha, the lower house of the Parliament of India from the Mohanlalganj constituency of Uttar Pradesh as a member of the Bharatiya Janata Party.

References

External links
 Official Biographical Sketch in Lok Sabha Website

1926 births
Possibly living people
Lok Sabha members from Uttar Pradesh
Bharatiya Janata Party politicians from Uttar Pradesh
People from Lucknow district